Jaison Tupy Barreto (16 August 1933 – 26 September 2021) was a Brazilian politician and physician.

References

1933 births
2021 deaths
Brazilian physicians
Members of the Federal Senate (Brazil)
Members of the Chamber of Deputies (Brazil) from Santa Catarina
Brazilian Democratic Movement politicians